Spider-Man is a 2000 action-adventure game based on the Marvel Comics character of the same name. It was developed by Neversoft and published by Activision for the PlayStation. The game was later ported by different developers to various systems, including the Game Boy Color and Nintendo 64 that same year, as well as the Dreamcast and Microsoft Windows in 2001.

The game's story follows Spider-Man as he attempts to clear his name after being framed by a doppelgänger and becoming a wanted criminal, while also having to foil a symbiote invasion orchestrated by Doctor Octopus and Carnage. Numerous villains from the comics appear as bosses, including Scorpion, Rhino, Venom, Mysterio, Carnage, and Doctor Octopus, as well as a Carnage symbiote-possessed Doctor Octopus named Monster-Ock, who was created exclusively for the game as the final boss. The game features narration from co-creator Stan Lee, and is the first Spider-Man game published by Activision following their acquisition of the license, which would expire in 2014.

Spider-Man received an overall generally positive reception. It was followed by three sequels in 2001: the Game Boy Color-exclusive Spider-Man 2: The Sinister Six, developed by Torus Games; the PlayStation-exclusive Spider-Man 2: Enter Electro, developed by Vicarious Visions; and the Game Boy Advance-exclusive Spider-Man: Mysterio's Menace, also developed by Vicarious Visions.

Gameplay

The game has the player controlling Spider-Man as he goes through each level, either trying to reach the exit or complete a certain objective. The player must retry the current level if Spider-Man runs out of health, falls off a building or fails to complete certain objectives such as rescuing a hostage. Spider-Man is able to utilize his spider powers to traverse the environments, being able to crawl on walls and ceilings, swing short distances and instantly zip between certain points. In combat, Spider-Man can utilize a limited supply of web-cartridges to attack his enemies, either webbing them up to stall or defeat them, increasing the strength of his attacks or forming an explosive barrier.

Spider-Man can also find comics, which unlock a Spider-Man comic book issue cover in the menu screen, as well as power-ups such as Spider-Armor which temporarily increases his strength and defense, and Fire Webbing which is effective against symbiotes. Several alternate costumes are available to unlock, each with their own attributes. Some costumes provide enhancements, while others provide no change or detriments. For example, the Spider-Man 2099 costume features enhanced strength, while the civilian Peter Parker suit limits the available number of web cartridges to two. The Ben Reilly costume in contrast contains no enhancements or detriments. The game also features narration from creator Stan Lee.

Plot
A supposedly reformed Dr. Otto Octavius is holding a scientific demonstration at the Science Expo 2000, but is interrupted when an impostor Spider-Man attacks the crew and steals his equipment. Eddie Brock tries to take pictures for the Daily Bugle, but the impostor shatters his camera. In rage, the Venom symbiote resurfaces inside Brock, and he vows revenge against Spider-Man. Meanwhile, the real Spider-Man, who witnessed the incident, is held responsible for the theft, and the police ensue a manhunt for him. Elsewhere, two unseen figures release some fog from their hidden base into the city, which quickly covers the streets.

After meeting with Black Cat and foiling a bank robbery by the Jade Syndicate, Spider-Man is forced to save J. Jonah Jameson from Scorpion. He defeats Scorpion, only for an ungrateful Jameson to call the police on him. While trying to escape, Spider-Man encounters Daredevil, who promises to spread the word about Spider-Man's innocence. After evading a police chopper, Spider-Man reunites with Black Cat, who informs him of two new problems: Rhino is attacking a power plant, and Venom has kidnapped his wife Mary Jane Parker to lure out Spider-Man. Choosing to deal with Rhino first, Spider-Man and Black Cat defeat him and leave him for the police, but the latter, badly wounded during the fight, is kidnapped by unknown assailants posing as paramedics.

After encouragement from the Human Torch, Spider-Man sets out to find Venom, only for him to appear behind Spider-Man and lead him on a chase through the city and then the sewers. While pursuing Venom, Spider-Man encounters the Lizard, who was imprisoned by Venom after taking control of his lizard-men (which attacked Spider-Man at various points during the chase). The Lizard points Spider-Man to Venom's lair, where the former rescues Mary Jane and defeats Venom. To make amends with Spider-Man after learning he was framed, Venom offers to help him figure out who did it. The two go to the Daily Bugle to search through Jameson's files for answers, but during the search, Venom senses Carnage's presence nearby and leaves to find him.

Left to investigate on his own, Spider-Man discovers an infestation of symbiotes in the building and clears them out, before encountering the impostor Spider-Man, revealed to be Mysterio in disguise. After defeating him, Spider-Man learns Mysterio was hired to keep Spider-Man distracted while his employer infests New York with symbiotes, and that the fog over the city will act as a beacon for the symbiotes, preparing the citizens for symbiosis. On his way to Warehouse 65, where the hideout of Mysterio's employer is located, Spider-Man encounters the Punisher, whom he convinces about his innocence and, in turn, he helps Spider-Man infiltrate the warehouse.

Spider-Man discovers an entrance to a massive undersea base inside the warehouse, and proceeds to investigate, quickly coming across a symbiote manufacturing operation and an imprisoned Black Cat. After disrupting the operation and rescuing Black Cat, Spider-Man finally confronts her kidnappers and the masterminds behind the symbiote invasion: Octavius and Carnage. Taking up his Doctor Octopus persona once again, Octavius explains that he faked his reform and that, with the help of Carnage (who donated his symbiote to be cloned), he hopes to create a new world dominated by symbiotes, under his rule. Just then, Venom appears and takes on Carnage, while Spider-Man fights Doc Ock. After both Doc Ock and Venom are defeated, Spider-Man fights Carnage and defeats him by tossing him into a sonic bubble. However, the Carnage symbiote then fuses with Doc Ock, creating Monster-Ock, who proceeds to chase Spider-Man through the self-destructing base until he is caught in an explosion, which removes the symbiote from Doc Ock's body. Spider-Man carries the unconscious Doc Ock to the surface, where they are saved by Captain America, Black Cat, and Venom.

In the epilogue, at the S.H.I.E.L.D. headquarters, Spider-Man is playing cards with Captain America, Daredevil, and the Punisher, while Black Cat and the Human Torch are dancing. In prison, Mysterio, Rhino, Scorpion, and a Jade Syndicate thug are also playing cards, while an annoyed Doc Ock is banging his head against the cell bars.

Development
The game was announced on December 2, 1998. Spider-Man uses the same game engine as Tony Hawk's Pro Skater. Spider-Man was a hidden character in Tony Hawk's Pro Skater 2, and a reference is made to this during gameplay. The PlayStation, Dreamcast, and Windows versions have pre-rendered cutscenes, whereas the Nintendo 64 version shows captioned freeze-frames done in the style of a comic book and with fewer voice clips, due to that console's technical limitations for cutscenes. The Lizard was meant to appear in the final cutscene but was not included in the final version of the game's cutscene. The earliest footage of the game was found in a German demo disc entitled PlayDemo Vol. 17, and featured some drastic changes from the final product. These include a different opening sequence, different (most likely placeholder) voices, different music, and an entirely different model for Scorpion and an entirely different Rhino boss stage, as well as a sewer level not found in the final game.

Audio

Some of the voice actors from both Spider-Man and Spider-Man Unlimited cartoons reprise their respective roles. For instance, Rino Romano reprises his role as Spider-Man/Peter Parker from Spider-Man Unlimited, Jennifer Hale reprises her roles as both Black Cat from the 1994 Spider-Man cartoon and Mary Jane Watson from Spider-Man Unlimited. Efrem Zimbalist Jr. reprises his role as Doctor Octopus from the 1994 Spider-Man TV series. The main song is a remix of the 1960s Spider-Man cartoon theme by the UK electronic music group Apollo 440. Stan Lee narrates key parts of the story. Daran Norris voices Venom/Eddie Brock, Mysterio, Scorpion, Punisher, Human Torch and Captain America, while Dee Bradley Baker voices Carnage, J. Jonah Jameson, the Lizard, Daredevil and Rhino. Chad Findley, lead designer of the game, is uncredited as voice director.

Soundtrack
The game's soundtrack was composed by Tommy Tallarico. It features a variation of tracks mostly arranged in individual samples and influenced by popular music genres of the time such as industrial rock and nu metal. The samples correlate to actions in-game, such as when Spider-Man is battling an enemy, and fade out when the action is over. However some levels have a fixed soundtrack, including boss battles. The Nintendo 64 port includes a sound test where the individual samples of tracks can be listened to. It can be accessed via cheat code.

Reception

While reviews varied from system to system, Spider-Man received generally positive reviews. GameRankings shows aggregate scores of 86.53% for the PlayStation version, 66.91% for the Game Boy Color version, 82.52% for the Nintendo 64 version, 80.23% for the Dreamcast version, and 67.96% for the PC version. Metacritic shows scores of 87 out of 100 for the PlayStation version, 72 out of 100 for the Nintendo 64 version, 80 out of 100 for the Dreamcast version, and 68 out of 100 for the PC version. In September 200 Activision reported that the game held the number two position for third-party published games on the PlayStation, though no official sales numbers were given.

IGN gave the PlayStation version a 9 out of 10, calling it "arguably, the best Spider-Man game", giving a 8.4 for the Dreamcast version calling it "good fun for anyone with a Dreamcast that hasn't played the PlayStation version", while expecting more from a powerful system like the Dreamcast. The PC version, however, got a scathing review for essentially being a port of the Dreamcast with no major changes. GameSpot gave the PlayStation version a 7.7, calling it "excellent framework on which to base future Spider-Man games – and an exceptional game to boot".

Greg Orlando reviewed the PlayStation version of the game for Next Generation, rating it four stars out of five, and stated that "Excelsior! Great web-slinging fun".

Scott Steinberg reviewed the Dreamcast version of the game for Next Generation, rating it four stars out of five, and stated that "a fun but slightly flawed superhero action adventure that'll have you bouncing off the walls. Literally".

Spider-Mans PlayStation version received a "Platinum" sales award from the Entertainment and Leisure Software Publishers Association (ELSPA), indicating sales of at least 300,000 copies in the United Kingdom.

Sequels
The game has spawned three sequels in 2001: Spider-Man 2: The Sinister Six served as an alternative continuation that followed the events of the Game Boy Color version instead. The game eventually got a true sequel titled Spider-Man 2: Enter Electro, released exclusively for the PlayStation, and a standalone sequel, Spider-Man: Mysterio's Menace, for the Game Boy Advance exclusively.

Potential remaster
In a November 2019 interview, former Neversoft employee and lead designer of Spider-Man Chad Findley expressed interest in developing a remaster of the game, but admitted that it would be unlikely due to "the nightmarish licensing and approval processes that are around these days".

Notes

References

External links

 
 Spider-Man games on Marvel.com
 
 

2000 video games
3D platform games
Action-adventure games
Activision beat 'em ups
Dreamcast games
Game Boy Color games
Neversoft games
Treyarch games
Nintendo 64 games
PlayStation (console) games
Superhero video games
Video games based on Spider-Man
Video games based on Venom (character)
Video games scored by Tommy Tallarico
Video games set in New York City
Video games with alternative versions
Windows games
Aspyr games
Single-player video games
Video games developed in the United States
Westlake Interactive games
Vicarious Visions games